Melody (formerly known as Melody FM) is a Malaysian Chinese-language radio station. It is managed by Astro Radio, a subsidiary of Astro Holdings Sdn Bhd. Melody FM was launched since 15 August 2012. Its frequencies were formerly used by radio station XFM (Xfresh). It was the second Astro Chinese radio station in Malaysia after My FM. In addition, Melody FM was the fifth Chinese radio station in Malaysia. The radio plays the Retro Chinese hits and some new easy listening music. Its music selections and content target mature audience which ages between 25–49 years old. In 2015, as according to Nielsen RAM Survey Wave #1, Melody FM had reach 398k listeners.

Frequency

 
(Via satellite TV)
 Astro (television): Channel 858

Gallery

References

External links 
 

2012 establishments in Malaysia
Radio stations established in 2012
Radio stations in Malaysia
Chinese-language radio stations in Malaysia